The Liberal Government of New Zealand was the first responsible government in New Zealand politics organised along party lines. The government formed following the founding of the Liberal Party and took office on 24 January 1891, and governed New Zealand for over 21 years until 10 July 1912. To date, it is the longest-serving government in New Zealand's history. The government was also historically notable for enacting significant social and economic changes, such as the Old Age Pensions Act and women's suffrage. One historian described the policies of the government as "a revolution in the relationship between the government and the people".

Significant policies

Economic
 Passed the Industrial Conciliation and Arbitration Act 1894. This established a conciliation and compulsory arbitration system with the aim of providing the unions with the means of protecting their members. The act encouraged the growth of unions by limiting labour representation at the arbitration court to registered unions.
 Legislation was introduced to protect vulnerable groups, such as the gumdiggers, miners, shop assistants, shearers, and servants.
 A department of labour was established (1891) to ensure that improvements in working conditions took place to inspect shearing sheds, shops, factories, and generally to examine working conditions. The new department helped to reduce unemployment by transporting labourers to jobs, and assisted more than 90,000 men and their dependents find a family income over the course of the next decade.
 Factory hours and working conditions were strictly regulated and children were removed from factories. The 1891 Factory Act gave legal definition to a factory. The 1894 Factory Act required registration and inspection of factories, specified maximum hours of work for women and young persons, and prevented those under the age of fourteen being employed in factories. By 1896, 4,600 factories with 31,000 workers and a further 7,000 shop assistants were registered with the Department of Labour.
 The 1892 Shop-Assistants Act dealt with sanitation and inspection. It also introduced a compulsory half-holiday for retail workers.
 The Wages Protection Bill (1898) was designed to protect workers' wage packets from arbitrary deductions by employers.
 The New Zealand Accident Insurance Act (1899) provided the commissioner of life insurance with the powers to insure people against accidents, and could also insure employers from liability for accidents to any of their employees.
 The Shipping and Seamen's Act (1894) specified minimum crews and safety conditions for shipping.
 The public service was significantly expanded between 1891 and 1911. By 1912, more than 40,000 people were on the state's payroll, compared to roughly 10,000 in 1890.
 The Coal Mines Act (1901) established state mines to compete directly with privately owned mines.
 The Fires Brigades Act (1906) increased subsidies for volunteer fire brigades.
 Public works schemes such as road construction were encouraged and helped to reduce unemployment.
 A land and income tax bill was passed which introduced direct taxation as well as a graduated land tax. The bill also repealed the former inequitable property tax.
 A significant industrial expansion took place, such as in the metal trades, in printing, in the clothing and processing industries, and in new industries such as electrical supply, fibrous-plaster works, and wire-marking.
 A state fire insurance office and state coal mines with their own sale depots were established.
 The Truck Act (1891) forced all employers to pay in cash instead of goods.
 The Coal Mines Act (1891) authorised the government to purchase two West Coast mines.
 The Employers' Liability Amendment Act enabled workers to recover damages for injuries received from either faulty equipment or negligence on the part of the employer, and also outlawed any arrangement whereby a worker agreed not to claim for any damages.
 The Contractors' and Workmen's Liens Bill protected the rights of workers and contractors for payment for work done.
 Forty-eight hours a week was established by law as the normal working time for men in factories (1901).
 Women and young people in employment were limited to a 45-hour workweek (1901).
 A law relating to shipping and seamen was passed which improved the safety and protection of those working on ships and provided for specified skilled officers and for the care of seamen taken ill.
 The Workers' Compensation for Accidents Act (1900) extended employers' liability for accidents to workers to cover "all injuries arising out of, and in the course of, employment".
 An accident branch of the Government Insurance Department was established (1901) to provide insurance facilities for employers for risk of injury. Under the act, certain diseases were classified as accidents (such as mercury poisoning, lead poisoning, and anthrax), and thus injury relating to a person's line of work "became recognised as a proper charge on industry".
 The Workmen's Wages Act required the wages of manual workers to be paid at least on a weekly basis, while also strengthening the protection of wage payments due under contracts.
 Provision of compensation for work-related injuries was introduced.
 The Shipping and Seamen's Amendment Act stipulated the proportion of trained shipmen on a ship.
 The Shop and Shop-assistants Act enforced weekend holidays.
 A factories act stipulated maximum working hours for women and children, while forbidding the employment of children under the age of fourteen.
 The Factories Act (1894) provided for the registration and inspection of factories and closely regulated the employment of women and children.
 A plan for unemployed workers to clear and then lease landholdings was sponsored.
 A women's employment bureau established (1895). 
 The government won the right to repurchase private land for development, with its Land for Settlements Act 1892, which was supported by a graduated land tax under the Land and Income Assessment Act 1891.
 A bureau of industries was established (1891) to help place people in jobs. The bureau provided male New Zealanders with employment on special relief works and also gave free railway passes to unemployed men to enable them to go to areas where jobs were available.
 Labour Day was made a public holiday (1899).
 Legislation was introduced to "facilitate and control insurance against industrial accidents.".
 A commercial trusts act (1910) was introduced to suppress monopolies.
 The Scaffolding Inspection Act 1906 required notification of intention to erect any structure or framework over 16 ft in height, or any swinging stage, "for the support of workmen engaged on building work". The legislation also provided for the appointment of inspectors with rights of entry and inspection, and allowed regulations to be made laying down minimum safety requirements.

Health

 Public Health Act founded the Department of Public Health in 1901.
 The Nurses' Registration Act (1901) provided for a course of three years' training and a state examination followed by registration.
 The Midwives' Act (1904) was passed with the aims of regulating midwifery through a midwives' register, providing better training of midwives, and reducing maternal and infant mortality amongst working-class mothers. The legislation also encouraged the construction of state maternity hospitals.
 Steps were taken to teach oral hygiene in schools following a plea by dentists to the government in 1905.
 Subsidies on a pound for pound basis were made available to local authorities for water purification and sanitation.
 A rudimentary district nursing system was set up in areas with a high Maori population.
 Maori medical services came to be co-ordinated under the auspices of the Department of public Health.
 The Hospital and Charitable Institutions Act (1909) established 36 hospital districts, each with an elected hospital board.
 A department of health was set up, which initially concentrated on providing better sanitation, clean water, and sewage disposal, and dealt with quarantine matters.
 Vaccination against several diseases was promoted.
 The Pharmacy Board worked on a set of regulations (in 1911) governing the labelling of food and drugs, and the protection of meat and milk products. They were gazetted in 1913 under the Sale of Food and drugs Act of 1907.
 The Juvenile Suppression Act (1903) introduced penalties for supplying tobacco to youths or for youths who smoked.
 A system of medical inspections of children before they passed out of primary school was initiated.
 The Opium Prohibition Amendment Act (1902) introduced harsher penalties for the import of opium for smoking.
 Hospitals were constructed for working-class mothers (1905).
 A department of tourist and health resorts was established (1901). It was the first government-sponsored tourism organisation in the world.

Welfare
 The Old-age Pensions Act of 1898 established a system of old-age pensions. Pensions were later introduced for widows (1911), Māori War veterans (1912), miners (1915), and the blind (1924).
 In 1911, miners suffering from pneumoconiosis began receiving payments from a small relief fund set up by the government the previous year.
 The Military Pensions Act (1911) introduced payments for veterans of the Māori War of the 1860s.
 A variety of superannuation schemes for government workers were introduced. Starting in 1893 with the Civil Service Insurance Act, special schemes for railway and post office workers were introduced. In 1908, a comprehensive retirement scheme for all remaining state employees was established.
The National Provident Fund Act (1910) encouraged the provision of annuities in old age. It also made special provision "for the support of dependent children by providing for the payment, on the death of a contributor, of a weekly allowance to the widow so long as any child is under 14 years of age, due after contributing for five years". Referred to as a "government friendly society", provided maternity medical expenses, sickness and death benefits, and a weekly pension at sixty which varied according to the level of contributions.
 Child welfare was given greater attention, as demonstrated by the passing of legislation raising the age of consent (1896), better protection for the homeless (1896), the prohibition of children from smoking (1903), and attempts to create effective legal structures for dealing with juveniles (1906).
 Protection for women in inheritance cases was introduced and deserting husbands were made to provide maintenance under the Testators' Family Maintenance Act (1900).
 The Workers Dwellings Act (1905) encouraged the construction of 648 houses by 1919.
 The Shearers' Accommodation Act (1898) improved living conditions for shearers by requiring that all accommodation and other sheds had to be inspected, and that proper sleeping and eating areas had to be provided.
 The money lent under the Advances to Workers Act (1906) led to the construction of 9,675 houses by 1919. By 1913, nearly 9,000 government housing loans had been extended by the government.
 Amendments to the Destitute Persons Laws in 1894, 1908 and 1910 extended rights to maintenance.
 The Testators' Family Maintenance Act (1900) helped to protect the economic rights of wives and children.
 A lease-in-perpetuity (999-year lease) was introduced (1892) to provide security for settlers who could not afford to purchase freehold land.
 Credit for land purchase and improvements was provided.
 Subletting of government contracts for public works was abolished.
 The Lands for Settlements Act opened up crown land for leasing. In 1894, it was amended to force owners of large estates to sell portions of their holdings.
 The Government Advances to Settlers Act (1894) significantly expanded the supply of credit available to farmers. It enabled farmers to borrow from the state upon security at reasonable interest rates.
 A department of agriculture was established.
 The lease-in-perpetuity was abolished to benefit freeholders. In its place, short renewable leases with periodic revaluations were introduced, and tenants were provided with the right to purchase their land outright at its current value.
 The old age pension was increased (1905) to compensate pensioners for an increase in the cost of living.
 Means testing of pensions was liberalised (1910). In 1905, £150 of the value of a property was not counted in the reduction of the pension allowable, an amount that was increased to £340 in 1910.
 The repeal of the property tax exempted more than half of all small farmers from paying tax.
 Cash payments were introduced for a man aged sixty and above and a woman aged fifty-five and above if he or she had two or more children under the age of fourteen (1911).
 The Adoption of Children Act (1895) introduced a process whereby any person in New Zealand could place an adoption order.
 The Destitute Persons Act (1910) made provision for illegitimate children and deserted wives and children. This legislation introduced the concept of attachment orders on wages, and was aimed at relieving destitution rather providing adequate long-term support.
 The Legitimation Act (1904) made provision for the registration of the birth of any child born out of wedlock where the parents had subsequently married. In cases such as these, the father of the child had to register the birth and make a declaration that at the time of the birth there was no legal impediment to his marriage to the mother.
 A national pension scheme for teachers was introduced (1905).
 The Infant Life Protection Act (1893) required that all homes "that received payment for looking after infants under the age of two for more than three consecutive days had to be licensed as foster homes and were subject to police inspection". This legislation was followed by another Act in 1896, which extended police powers of inspection and raised the upper age limit to four years.
 The Infant Life Protection Act (1907) required a doctor or midwife in attendance at the birth of an infant to notify the local registrar of the birth and a parent or his or her agent to complete the register entry.

Education

 Increased funds were allocated to education.
 Many new schools were built each year, while the number of teachers grew more rapidly than students, enabling class sizes to be reduced.
The Manual and Technical Instruction acts of 1900 and 1902 provided local authorities with the power to spend money on technical education and make land grants.
 Technical education was expanded, with 13,500 students attending such classes by 1912 at eight institutions.
 After 1895, students could receive assistance with rail transport to and from schools, and over the next few years small boarding allowances were paid as well.
 A free textbook scheme was launched.
 Bursaries were introduced for pupils who passed the matriculation exam with credit (1907). This led to a rise in the number of students who could attend university without having pay any fees.
 The Public-school Teachers' Salaries Act (1901) established a national scale of salaries.
 Higher leaving certificates were instituted to be awarded to secondary school students "who satisfactorily completed one year at approved post-matriculation studies" (1901). This ensured that any student who passed their university entrance examination and stayed another year at a secondary school studying an approved course could (if their work was of a good standard) receive a free university place for four years.
 New regulations for the examination and inspection of schools were introduced, which provided head teachers with greater freedom in the classification of their pupils.
 More secondary schools were brought into the national system (1903).
 By the outbreak of the First World War the national primary school service had been considerably improved.
 Free places in secondary schools were introduced (1902). By the end of the First Liberal Government, fewer than 20% of all secondary students paid any fees.

Foreign policy
 Declared the Flag of New Zealand as New Zealand's national flag in 1902.
 Committed New Zealand troops to the Boer War.
 Annexed the Cook Islands (1901)
New Zealand's foreign policy at this time expressed a sense of nationhood but also of Britishness: New Zealanders were proud of their young nation and of being part of the British Empire. The annexation of the Cook Islands can be seen as part of a desire to create a miniature empire in the Pacific, which would be part of the wider British Empire. New Zealand's enthusiastic involvement in the Boer War expressed both loyalty to 'mother Britain' and a sense of being a nation which could play its part on the world stage. The war was the first overseas conflict to which New Zealand committed troops. Although the New Zealand blue ensign became the country's national flag, the Union Jack, the flag of Great Britain, continued to be widely used (the medals awarded at the conclusion of the war featured the flag of the United Tribes of New Zealand).

Treaty of Waitangi and Maori
 Passed the Tohunga Suppression Act in 1907.
 The Māori Councils Act (1900) instituted local councils for Māori; although short-lived, it brought some improvements in health, slowed land sales, and provided Māori with more say in running their local affairs.
 A rudimentary district nursing system was set up in areas with a high Māori population.
 Māori medical services came to be co-ordinated under the auspices of the Department of Public Health.
 Housing conditions for Māori were considerably improved between 1904 and 1909.
 Six-thousand Māori were vaccinated between 1901 and 1905.
 Māori councils were provided with additional powers to enforce standards of hygiene (1901).
 Māori district high schools were developed.

Constitutional

 Passed a resolution declaring New Zealand the Dominion of New Zealand in 1907, formally ending colonial status.
 Granted women's suffrage in 1893 (despite Seddon's efforts to have the Legislative Council stop it). 
 Life membership in the upper house was reduced to a seven-year term.
 The stranglehold of the legislative council was broken.
 Women were granted practical equality and divorce rights.
 The Divorce Act (1898), and the repeal (1910) of the Contagious Diseases Act removed various forms of legal discrimination against women.
 A defence act was made law (1910) to introduce compulsory military training.
 The Crimes Act (1910) introduced the "reformative detention" sentence, which ensured that a person could be held for a period long enough for necessary reform training to be undertaken.

Formation
The formation of the Liberal Party came after the victory of liberal-leaning members of parliament, led by John Ballance, at the 1890 general election

The attempt by Harry Atkinson and other members of the previous government to stack the Legislative Council against the new government backfired on them.

Defeat
The government lost its majority at the 1911 general election, but managed to stay in office with the support of independent MPs until the following year. The government was eventually defeated in a vote of confidence on 10 July 1912, with the defection of some Liberals like John A. Millar.

Election results

Notes:-
1. The vote totals and percentages, from 1890 to 1902, exclude the four Maori electorates. From 1890 to 1902 additional votes cast in four three-member electorates are included. The comparability over time of the vote totals are also affected by unopposed elections. The electorates where there was no contest numbered six in 1890, three in 1893 and 1899, and one in 1911.
2. There were no organized parties at the time of the 1890 election. The figures given are an approximate indication of the division of political opinion between Liberals and others.
3. The seat figures given are from the Elections New Zealand website. They are the same as those in the International Almanac of Electoral History.

Prime Ministers
Five premiers and prime ministers (the title of premier was changed during the term in office of the government) served during the government's tenure, with two (Ballance and Seddon) dying in office:

Cabinet Ministers

See also
 Governments of New Zealand

Notes

References

Further reading

External links
 Official election results website
 The Seddon-Stout struggle for power
 Liberal Party reforms

Ministries of Queen Victoria
Ministries of Edward VII
Ministries of George V
Liberal
19th century in New Zealand
20th century in New Zealand
1891 establishments in New Zealand
1912 disestablishments in New Zealand
Cabinets established in 1891
Cabinets disestablished in 1912